The 2001 Pontiac Excitement 400 was the 11th stock car race of the 2001 NASCAR Winston Cup Series and the 47th iteration of the event. The race was held on Saturday, May 5, 2001, in Richmond, Virginia, at Richmond International Raceway, a 0.75 miles (1.21 km) D-shaped oval. The race took the scheduled 400 laps to complete. At race's end, Tony Stewart, driving for Joe Gibbs Racing, would hold off the field on the final restart with two to go to win his 10th career NASCAR Winston Cup Series win and his first of the season. To fill out the podium, Jeff Gordon, driving for Hendrick Motorsports, and Rusty Wallace, driving for Penske Racing South, would finish second and third, respectively.

Background 

Richmond International Raceway (RIR) is a 3/4-mile (1.2 km), D-shaped, asphalt race track located just outside Richmond, Virginia in Henrico County. It hosts the Monster Energy NASCAR Cup Series and Xfinity Series. Known as "America's premier short track", it formerly hosted a NASCAR Camping World Truck Series race, an IndyCar Series race, and two USAC sprint car races.

Entry list 

 (R) denotes rookie driver.

Practice

First practice 
The first practice session was held on Friday, May 4, at 12:00 PM EST. The session would last for two hours.

Second and final practice 
The final practice session, sometimes referred to as Happy Hour, was held on Friday, May 4, at 5:50 PM EST. The session would last for one hour and 30 minutes.

Qualifying 
Qualifying was held on Friday, May 4, at 3:30 PM EST. Each driver would have two laps to set a fastest time; the fastest of the two would count as their official qualifying lap. Positions 1-36 would be decided on time, while positions 37-43 would be based on provisionals. Six spots are awarded by the use of provisionals based on owner's points. The seventh is awarded to a past champion who has not otherwise qualified for the race. If no past champ needs the provisional, the next team in the owner points will be awarded a provisional.

Three drivers would fail to qualify: Buckshot Jones, Hermie Sadler, and Hut Stricklin.

Full qualifying results

Race results

References 

2001 NASCAR Winston Cup Series
NASCAR races at Richmond Raceway
2001 in sports in Virginia
May 2001 sports events in the United States